Alexandre Grenier (born September 5, 1991) is a Canadian professional ice hockey player. He is playing with Eisbären Berlin of the Deutsche Eishockey Liga (DEL). Grenier was selected by the Vancouver Canucks in the 3rd round (90th overall) of the 2011 NHL Entry Draft.

Playing career
As a youth, Grenier played in the 2004 Quebec International Pee-Wee Hockey Tournament with a minor ice hockey team from Collège Charles-Lemoyne.

Grenier made his professional debut playing with EC Red Bull Salzburg of the Austrian Hockey League during the 2012–13 season. After 25 games with the Red Bulls, Grenier opted to return to North America, signing an AHL deal for the remainder of the season with the Canucks AHL affiliate, the Chicago Wolves on January 6, 2013. At the conclusion of the season with the Wolves, Grenier was belatedly signed by the Canucks to a two-year entry-level contract on April 30, 2013.

In his fourth season within the Canucks organization during the 2015–16 season, Grenier's development was rewarded in receiving his first NHL recall on November 18, 2015. He made his NHL debut with the Canucks later that night in a 4–1 loss to the Winnipeg Jets at the MTS Centre. On March 14, 2016 Grenier was recalled to the  Vancouver Canucks, as Brendan Gaunce had been reassigned to the Utica Comets.

On July 1, 2017, Grenier signed a one-year, two-way contract with the Florida Panthers after he did not receive a contract offer from the Canucks. He was assigned to AHL affiliate, the Springfield Thunderbirds for the duration of the 2017–18 season, notching a professional high 20 goals in amassing 44 points in 72 games.

Having left the Panthers organization as a free agent, Grenier signed a one-year AHL contract with hometown club, the Laval Rocket, on July 1, 2018.

Following the conclusion his contract with the Rocket, Grenier as a free agent opted to continue his career in Europe, agreeing to a one-year contract for the 2019–20 season with German outfit, Iserlohn Roosters of the DEL on October 15, 2019. After agreeing to a one-year contract extension with the Roosters, on February 3, 2020, Grenier joined Lausanne HC on loan to provide depth for the final playoffs push. He made 10 appearances with Lausanne before the season was cancelled due to the COVID-19 pandemic, later returning to resume his contract with Iserlohn.

On April 27, 2021, Grenier returned to the National League (NL) and agreed to a one-year contract with the SCL Tigers for the 2021–22 season.

Career statistics

Regular season and playoffs

Awards and honours

References

External links

1991 births
Canadian expatriate ice hockey players in Austria
Canadian ice hockey right wingers
Chicago Wolves players
EC Red Bull Salzburg players
Eisbären Berlin players
Halifax Mooseheads players
Ice hockey people from Quebec
Iserlohn Roosters players
Kalamazoo Wings (ECHL) players
Lausanne HC players
Laval Rocket players
Living people
Canadian people of French descent
Quebec Remparts players
SCL Tigers players
Sportspeople from Laval, Quebec
Springfield Thunderbirds players
Utica Comets players
Vancouver Canucks draft picks
Vancouver Canucks players
20th-century Canadian people
21st-century Canadian people